Kate Hennig is a Canadian actress and playwright, currently the associate artistic director of the Shaw Festival.

Early life and education 
Hennig was born in Harlow, Ontario near London. Her father was a Lutheran minister. She and her family moved to Edmonton when Hennig was 7. Hennig attended York University briefly before dropping out.

In 2002, Hennig was awarded a master's degree from the Central School of Speech and Drama in London.

Career 
She was a shortlisted Dora Mavor Moore Award nominee for Best Actress in a Play (Large Theatre) in 2003 for The Danish Play, and won the Dora for Best Actress in a Musical in 2011 for Billy Elliot. Although predominantly a stage actress, she also received a Genie Award nomination for Best Supporting Actress in 1993 for her performance in Thirty Two Short Films About Glenn Gould, and has appeared in the films Mrs. Winterbourne and The Claim, and the television series Bomb Girls, Saving Hope and L.M. Montgomery's Anne of Green Gables.

As a playwright, she has written the plays The Last Wife, The Virgin Trial, and Mother's Daughter. She was nominated for Outstanding New Play at the 2017 Dora Mavor Moore Awards and shortlisted for the Governor General's Award for English-language drama at the 2017 Governor General's Awards for The Virgin Trial.

In 2019, Hennig directed Holiday Inn at the Shaw Festival.

Personal life 
Hennig married and later divorced Ian Prinsloo. She moved back Toronto from Calgary in 2001, after her run as Sally Bowles in Cabaret ended.

Filmography

Film

Television

Theatre

Plays
The Eleventh David
More
Waterworks, later titled Drowning Out of Water
The Queenmaker Trilogy:
The Last Wife
The Virgin Trial
Mother’s Daughter
Cyrano de Bergerac (translation and adaptation)
Wilde Tales

References

External links

21st-century Canadian actresses
21st-century Canadian dramatists and playwrights
Canadian stage actresses
Canadian television actresses
Canadian film actresses
Canadian women dramatists and playwrights
Canadian theatre directors
Dora Mavor Moore Award winners
Actresses from Toronto
Writers from Toronto
Living people
Canadian Shakespearean actresses
21st-century Canadian women writers
Year of birth missing (living people)
Alumni of the Royal Central School of Speech and Drama